Alfonso Pérez (born January 16, 1949 in Cartagena) is a retired boxer from Colombia, who won the bronze medal in the men's lightweight division (– 60 kilograms) at the 1972 Summer Olympics. In 1971 he won the silver medal at the Pan American Games. He turned pro on April 6, 1973, and retired in 1981 after 40 bouts (27 wins, 10 losses and 3 draws, 20 wins by way of knockout).

Perez had the ability of fighting as a lightweight or losing weight and competing as a featherweight, and he holds a win by knockout in three rounds over then-undefeated, future WBA world featherweight champion and hall of fame member Eusebio Pedroza.
Perez was national champion in Colombia both as a featherweight and as a lightweight, and also the WBC's Caribbean area lightweight champion.

1972 Olympic record
Below is the record of Alfonso Perez, a Colombian lightweight boxer who competed at the 1972 Munich Olympics:

 Round of 64: bye
 Round of 32: defeated Peter Odhiambo II (Uganda) by decision, 5-0
 Round of 16: defeated Karel Kaspar (Czechoslovakia) by decision, 5-0
 Quarterfinal: defeated Erasian Doruk (Turkey) by decision, 3-2
 Semifinal: lost to Laszlo Orban (Hungary) by decision, 2-3 (was awarded a bronze medal)

References
 

1949 births
Living people
Olympic boxers of Colombia
Olympic bronze medalists for Colombia
Boxers at the 1972 Summer Olympics
Sportspeople from Cartagena, Colombia
Olympic medalists in boxing
Colombian male boxers
Medalists at the 1972 Summer Olympics
Boxers at the 1971 Pan American Games
Pan American Games silver medalists for Colombia
Pan American Games medalists in boxing
Lightweight boxers
Medalists at the 1971 Pan American Games
20th-century Colombian people